Riverside was a territorial electoral district in Yukon. The district elected one member to the Yukon Legislative Assembly from 1992 to 2002.

At the 2002 election, the district was dissolved into Whitehorse Centre and Riverdale North. It is the former seat of Yukon Commissioner Jack Cable.

Members

Election results

2000 general election

|-

| Liberal
| Scott Kent
| align="right"|359
| align="right"|54.3
| align="right"|

| NDP
| Jasbir Randhawa
| align="right"|202
| align="right"|30.6
| align="right"|

| Yukon Party
| Michael Weinert
| align="right"|100
| align="right"|15.1
| align="right"|
|-
! align=left colspan=3|Total
! align=right|661
! align=right|100
|}

1996 general election

|-

| Liberal
| Jack Cable
| align="right"|267
| align="right"|38.9
| align="right"|

| NDP
| Gary Umbrich
| align="right"|260
| align="right"|37.8
| align="right"|

| Yukon Party
| Ed Henderson
| align="right"|160
| align="right"|23.3
| align="right"|
|-
! align=left colspan=3|Total
! align=right|687
! align=right|100
|}

1992 general election

|-

| Liberal
| Jack Cable
| align="right"|291
| align="right"|37.9
| align="right"|

| Yukon Party
| Nancy Huston
| align="right"|265
| align="right"|34.5
| align="right"|

| NDP
| Joyce Hayden
| align="right"|212
| align="right"|27.6
| align="right"|
|-
! align=left colspan=3|Total
! align=right|768
! align=right|100
|}

Former Yukon territorial electoral districts